The Printing plant of Ogonyok  magazine in Moscow, designed by El Lissitzky, is likely the only extant building based on Lissitzky's blueprints. Located at 17, 1st Samotechny Lane, it is Lissitzky's sole tangible work of architecture. It was commissioned in 1932 by Ogonyok magazine to be used as a print shop. In June 2007 the independent Russky Avangard foundation filed a request to list the building on the heritage register. In September 2007 the city commission (Moskomnasledie) approved the request and passed it to the city government for a final approval, which happened in August 2008. In October 2008, the abandoned building was badly damaged by fire.
Next door, a developer Inteco has started
preparations for construction of a new block of flats for the Film-Makers' Union.

In 2012, its status was upgraded to regional landmark, and it was announced that the building would be restored and become part of a hotel complex. Works since then have involved extensive alteration rather than restoration.

References

External links

 Moscow authorities' campaign of 'cultural vandalism' continues apace, Rob Gregory, "The Architectural Review", March, 2010
 Lissitzky printing plant and Zhurgaz house
 A letter from Moscow
 Printing plant of "Ogonyok" magazine by El Lissitzky - video

Artworks by El Lissitzky
Russian avant-garde
Constructivist architecture
Buildings and structures in Moscow
Buildings and structures built in the Soviet Union
Buildings and structures completed in 1932
Cultural heritage monuments of regional significance in Moscow